Prunus oleifolia is a species of Prunus native to southern South America, including Bolivia, Paraguay, Brazil and Argentina. It is a tree 5-18 mtall. In spite of some confusion involving its missing holotype and poor descriptions, it is a good species, and a close relative of Prunus reflexa.

References

oleifolia
Flora of Argentina
Flora of Bolivia
Flora of Brazil
Flora of Paraguay
Plants described in 1915